In game theory, an n-player game is a game which is well defined for any number of players. This is usually used in contrast to standard 2-player games that are only specified for two players. In defining n-player games, game theorists usually provide a definition that allow for any (finite) number of players.

Changing games from 2-player games to n-player games entails some concerns. For instance, the Prisoner's dilemma is a 2-player game. One might define an n-player Prisoner's Dilemma where a single defection results everyone else getting the sucker's payoff. Alternatively, it might take certain amount of defection before the cooperators receive the sucker's payoff. (One example of an n-player Prisoner's Dilemma is the Diner's dilemma.)

References

Game theory game classes